Community boards of the Bronx are the 12 New York City community boards in the borough of the Bronx, which are the appointed advisory groups of the community districts that advise on land use and zoning, participate in the city budget process, and address service delivery in their district.

Community boards are each composed of up to 50 volunteer members appointed by the Bronx borough president, half from nominations by City Council members representing the community district (i.e., whose council districts cover part of the community district). Additionally, all City Council members representing the community district are non-voting, ex officio board members.

History 
The 1963 revision of the New York City Charter extended the Borough of Manhattan's "Community Planning Councils" (est. 1951) to the outer boroughs as "Community Planning Boards", which are now known as "Community Boards".

The 1975 revision of the New York City Charter set the number of Community Districts/Boards to 59, established the position of the district manager for the community districts, and created the Uniform Land Use Review Procedure (ULURP) which gave the community boards the authority to review land use proposals such as zoning actions, and special permits.

Community Districts

The Bronx Borough Board 

The Bronx Borough Board is composed of the borough president, New York City Council members whose districts are part of the borough, and the chairperson of each community board in the Bronx.

The current borough board is composed of the 22 members listed in the table below:

Other areas 

Within the borough of The Bronx there are three Joint Interest Areas (JIA), which are outside of the jurisdiction of individual community districts, and have their own district number. The three JIAs in the county of The Bronx are:
 District 27 - Bronx Park, 2010 Census population: 1351
 District 28 - Pelham Bay Park, 2010 Census population: 432
 District 26 - Van Cortlandt Park, 2010 Census population: Zero

Marble Hill, which is a part of New York County, is represented by Bronx Community District 8.

Rikers Island, while a part of The Bronx, is represented by Queens Community District 1.

Notable people 

Notable people who were community board members and/or staffers prior to becoming elected officials:
 Rafael Salamanca (CB2 member and District Manager)

 Eric Stevenson (politician) (CB3 member)

 Latoya Joyner (CB4 member)

 Adolfo Carrión Jr. (CB5 District Manager)

 Andrew Cohen (politician) (CB8 member)
 Eric Dinowitz (CB8 member)

 Marjorie Velázquez (CB10 member)
 James Vacca (CB10 Chairperson and District Manager)

Jeffrey D. Klein (CB11 member)

Gallery

See also 
 List of Bronx neighborhoods
 Borough boards of New York City
 Government of New York City
 New York City Council
 Borough president

References

External links
 Bronx Community Boards
 BoardStat from BetaNYC

 
Bronx-related lists
Community Boards of the Bronx
Lists of populated places in New York (state)
Lists of neighborhoods in U.S. cities

Urban planning in New York City